The 	All-Japan Water Supply Workers' Union (Zensuido) is a trade union representing workers in the water industry in Japan.

The union was founded in 1951 by municipal workers involved in water supply and sewerage.  The union affiliated to the General Council of Trade Unions of Japan, and by 1967, it had 31,699 members.  It has been affiliated to the Japanese Trade Union Confederation since the late 1980s.  By 2020, its membership had fallen to 16,281.

External links

References

Trade unions established in 1951
Trade unions in Japan